Luke Pike may refer to:

 Sonny Pike (born 1980s), English footballer 
 Luke Owen Pike (1835–1915), English barrister-at-law, writer and historical researcher